"If I Ever Lose My Faith in You" is a song by English singer-songwriter Sting, released on 1 February 1993 as the lead single from his fourth studio album, Ten Summoner's Tales (1993). The song reached number 17 on the US Billboard Hot 100 and the top 40 in several European countries. In Canada, the song reached number one, spending three weeks atop the RPM Top Singles chart and finishing 1993 as Canada's fourth-most-successful single.

In 1994, the song won Sting a Grammy Award for Best Male Pop Vocal Performance, while it was also nominated for both Record of the Year and for Song of the Year. It has been included on all of Sting's compilation albums since its release, namely Fields of Gold: The Best of Sting 1984-1994 and The Very Best of Sting & The Police.

Composition
The song, in the key of A major, is played in swing time. According to Sting, the song was written on the piano, and contains a flattened fifth in the song's intro, which he says was banned in the churches due to its dissonant sound:

The "You" in the song's title is not identified by Sting, as he explained he felt it was important not to point out what it is specifically so that the listeners could connect more with the song:

Critical reception
Alan Jones from Music Week gave the song three out of five, writing, "Less gloomy and more immediate commercial than some of his solo material, though it won't hit the high numbers."

After the dark vision presented on "The Soul Cages", Sting wanted to "make a pop record in the truest sense."  "I loved making it. I had to make it, just as I had to make the last one," the intense, autobiographical "Soul Cages." "Being on the rebound from that very dark record, this time I wanted to make one for the fun of it, the craft of it - to engage the band musically."

Sting was amazed by how popular the song became. "I got a prize for this. It was the most played record on American radio in 1993, which kind of surprised me," said Sting. "But I suppose it captured a mood. We've lost faith in a lot of institutions, our government, our churches – most things. And yet we still maintain a sense of hope about the future."

Other Versions
In 2020 the heavy metal act "Disturbed" produced the classic Sting song “If I Ever Lose My Faith in You” after the success of their 2015 cover  of Simon & Garfunkel’s “The Sound of Silence”. “We have loved this song for a long time, and even though it was released in 1993, it seems strangely applicable to today’s world,” stated the band. “The song is about losing faith, and might initially sound pessimistic, but it’s about the importance and power of personal relationships, and how they can save you and provide solace in an increasingly confusing world.”

Track listings
 CD maxi
 "If I Ever Lose My Faith in You" — 4:29
 "Message in a Bottle" [Unplugged] — 5:20
 "Tea in the Sahara" [Unplugged] — 4:25
 "Walking on the Moon" [Unplugged] — 5:06

 CD single 1
 "If I Ever Lose My Faith in You" — 4:29
 "All This Time" [Unplugged] — 5:20
 "Mad About You" [Unplugged] — 4:24
 "Every Breath You Take" [Unplugged] — 5:06

 CD single 2
 "If I Ever Lose My Faith in You" — 4:33
 "Message in a Bottle" [Unplugged] — 5:47
 "Tea in the Sahara" [Unplugged] — 4:43
 "Walking on the Moon" [Unplugged] — 2:56

 CD maxi – picture disc US
 "If I Ever Lose My Faith in You" — 4:29
 "Everybody Laughed But You" — 3:51
 "January Stars" — 3:50
 "We Work The Black Seam" [Alternate Version] — 6:08

Credits
 Sting – bass, vocals, guitar, harmonica; producer on track 1
 Dominic Miller – guitars
 David Sancious – keyboards; piano on tracks 2-4
 Vinnie Colaiuta – drums
 Vinx – percussion and backing vocals on tracks 2-4
 Hugh Padgham – producer on track 1
 Joel Gallen – executive producer on tracks 2-4
 Alex Coletti – producer on tracks 2-4

Charts

Weekly charts

Year-end charts

Cover versions
In 2009, trumpeter Chris Botti covered the song featuring Sting on vocals. The song was released from the album Chris Botti in Boston. American singer Lady Gaga also performed the song at the 2014 Kennedy Center Honors, where Sting was an honouree. American heavy metal band Disturbed released a cover in 2020.

Notes

References

1992 songs
1993 singles
A&M Records singles
Grammy Award for Best Male Pop Vocal Performance
Music videos directed by Howard Greenhalgh
RPM Top Singles number-one singles
Song recordings produced by Hugh Padgham
Songs written by Sting (musician)
Sting (musician) songs